(lit. 'Art Research') is a triannual academic journal of art history, with a particular focus upon Japanese art. The journal is published in Japanese, with summaries in English, by the Tokyo Research Institute for Cultural Properties. The publication is also known as The Journal of Art Studies.

See also
 Hozon Kagaku
 Bijutsu-shi

References

External links 
  
  

Japanese art
Japanese-language journals
Publications established in 1932
Triannual journals
Art history journals
1932 establishments in Japan